Danbury is a city in Brazoria County, Texas, United States. It is located northeast of Angleton along the Union Pacific Railroad and County Road 171. The city boasts its own school district. The population was 1,671 at the 2020 census.

Geography

Danbury is located northeast of the center of Brazoria County at  (29.228694, –95.346574), next to Flores Bayou.

This decrease is believed to be caused by the extraction of groundwater (9% of total declination), the extraction of petroleum products (88% of total declination) with a probable calculated seasonal difference in soil moisture accounting for the remainder.

Municipal and Government services

Demographics

As of the 2020 United States census, there were 1,671 people, 467 households, and 355 families residing in the city.

As of the census of 2000, there were 1,611 people, 554 households, and 442 families residing in the city. The population density was 1,678.1 people per square mile (647.9/km2). There were 586 housing units at an average density of 610.4 per square mile (235.7/km2). The racial makeup of the city was 90.38% White, 0.62% African American, 0.19% Native American, 0.31% Asian, 0.06% Pacific Islander, 6.15% from other races, and 2.30% from two or more races. Hispanic or Latino of any race were 15.52% of the population.

There were 554 households, out of which 46.6% had children under the age of 18 living with them, 63.7% were married couples living together, 11.6% had a female householder with no husband present, and 20.2% were non-families. 18.1% of all households were made up of individuals, and 7.8% had someone living alone who was 65 years of age or older. The average household size was 2.91 and the average family size was 3.30.  Danbury elected its first mayor in 1961. The first mayor of Danbury was E.J. Filipp.

In the city, the population was spread out, with 31.9% under the age of 18, 9.9% from 18 to 24, 29.5% from 25 to 44, 20.4% from 45 to 64, and 8.3% who were 65 years of age or older. The median age was 32 years. For every 100 females, there were 99.1 males. For every 100 females age 18 and over, there were 95.5 males.

The median income for a household in the city was $50,536, and the median income for a family was $56,250. Males had a median income of $44,250 versus $25,893 for females. The per capita income for the city was $17,565. About 6.0% of families and 7.6% of the population were below the poverty line, including 9.2% of those under age 18 and 13.9% of those age 65 or over.

Danbury is served by three churches (two Baptist and one Catholic) which claim as members 44% of the city's population.

Education 

Danbury is served by the Danbury Independent School District.

School Colors: Black and Vegas Gold

High School Athletics:
Danbury High Schools's athletics department offers Football, Powerlifting, Volleyball, Cross Country, Basketball, Baseball, Softball, Track, Tennis and Golf. The school has a varsity cheerleading team and a marching band. The track around the football field was recently repaired/resurfaced, and a new weight room has been added as well.

State Titles: 
Baseball – 2009(2A)  
Softball – 2004(2A) 2011(2A)

The Danbury Library is a part of the Brazoria County Library System.

The Texas Legislature designated Danbury ISD as being in the Alvin Community College zone.

References

Cities in Texas
Cities in Brazoria County, Texas
Greater Houston